The Voice is the third studio album by American Tejano music singer Jay Perez. The album peaked at number seven on the US Billboard Regional Mexican Albums chart. It garnered Perez a nomination for Album of the Year (Orchestra) at the 1996 Tejano Music Awards. Perez recorded "Let's Get it On", originally recorded by Marvin Gaye.

Track listing 
Credits adapted from the liner notes of The Voice.

Charts

See also 

 1995 in Latin music
 Latin American music in the United States

References

Works cited 

1995 albums
Sony Discos albums
Spanish-language albums
Jay Perez albums
Albums recorded at Q-Productions